Mikyö Dorje (1507–1554) was the eighth Karmapa, head of the Kagyu school of Tibetan Buddhism.

Biography

Mikyö Dorje was born in Satam, Kham. According to the legend, he said after being born: "I am Karmapa." and was recognized by Tai Situpa. In this case there was another child from Amdo who also claimed to be Karmapa. Gyaltsab Rinpoche, the regent of the region, thought of a test to decide who was the real Karmapa. This was the first time that a test was used to determine a reincarnation. Later this became the standard method for all major lamas.

Mikyö Dorje left numerous Buddhist writings on  Gongchik commentary Madhyamaka, Abhidharma, Tantric and Mahamudra texts, poetry (verses of profound wisdom) and even linguistics. He introduced special guru yoga in four sessions, which is the basis for Karma Kagyu teachings. He was also a skillful painter and metal craftsman with many famous thangkas and statues. The eighth Karmapa strongly influenced all arts of his time. He was invited by the emperor of China, however he said that the emperor would die before he could get to him; and according to the legend it happened as well.

He selected as lineage holder the fifth Shamarpa, Konchog Yenlag, whom he had identified, and to whom he had passed on the Kagyu transmission, stating that the Karmapa and Shamarpa incarnations are inseparable, and of the same mindstream.

He compiled a biography of Bodong Chogle Namgyal (1376–1451), one of the main teachers of Dorje Pakmo, entitled Ocean of Miracles (ngo mtshar gyi rgya mtsho).

Works 
The Hundred Pith Instructions of Karmapa Mikyö Dorje 
 The Collection of Monastic Activities 
E-Wam Mahamudra, An Introduction to the Three Kayas 
Introduction to the Middle Way

References

Further reading

External links
http://www.karmapa.org
Mantra Karmapa mkyen no (Karmapa Chenno)
TBRC - Tibetan Buddhist Resource Center entry for Mikyö Dorje

16th-century lamas
1507 births
1554 deaths
8
16th-century Tibetan people
Tibetan philosophers
Buddhist artists